Kåre Nordahl Østensen (born 5 December 1943) is a Norwegian ice hockey player. He played for the Norwegian national ice hockey team, and  participated at the Winter Olympics in 1964, 1968 and 1972. 

He played for the club IK Tigrene.

References

External links
 

1943 births
Living people
Ice hockey players at the 1964 Winter Olympics
Ice hockey players at the 1968 Winter Olympics
Ice hockey players at the 1972 Winter Olympics
Frisk Asker Ishockey players
Norwegian ice hockey players
Olympic ice hockey players of Norway
Ice hockey people from Oslo